Nicolaes Witsen (8 May 1641 – 10 August 1717; modern Dutch: Nicolaas Witsen) was a Dutch statesman who was mayor of Amsterdam thirteen times, between 1682 and 1706. In 1693 he became administrator of the Dutch East India Company (VOC). In 1689 he was extraordinary-ambassador to the English court and became Fellow of the Royal Society. In his free time, he was cartographer, maritime writer, and an authority on shipbuilding. His books on the subject are important sources on Dutch shipbuilding in the 17th century. Furthermore, he was an expert on Russian affairs. He was the first to describe Siberia, the Far East and Central Asia in his study Noord en Oost Tartarye [North and East Tartary].

Early life
Nicolaes Witsen was born in Amsterdam As a member of the Witsen family. His father Cornelis Jan Witsen Was burgomaster, head bailiff and administrator of the Dutch West India Company. In 1656 Nicolaes went with his father to England, where he was introduced to Oliver Cromwell's children. In March 1662 Nicolaes Witsen held a disputation at the Amsterdam Athenaeum Illustre, in which he argued against the influence of comets on the welfare of all earthly things, possibly influenced by his nephew Joannes Hudde. In 1664 and 1665 Nicolaes made an embassy to Moscovia with the envoy Jacob Boreel. By boat, they went to Riga, then Swedish, and overland to Novgorod and Moscow. There he met with Andrew Vinius, who became his life long friend, sending him maps and objects. The talks with czar Alexis of Russia about a monopoly on tar were no success.  Witsen wrote in his diary that no-one there was occupied with art or science. Witsen visited the Patriarch Nikon and made notes on the worship of icons, interested in his name saint (and patron saint of Amsterdam), saint Nicholas. He studied law at Leiden University, but became more interested in languages and maps. In the 1666–1667 Witsen travelled to Rome and met with Cosimo III de' Medici in Pisa. In Paris, he met the scientist Melchisédech Thévenot. In 1668 he travelled to Oxford. In 1674 he married Catherina Hochepied. Four children were born, not surviving childhood.

Shipbuilding
Witsen wrote "Aeloude and hedendaegsche Scheepsbouw en Bestier" in 1671, which quickly became seen as the standard work on the subject.  Even an anatomist like Steno read the book. The technique Witsen describes is shell-first, and not frame-first.  The book is not easy to read, because of misty wording and the chaotic structure, but has a lot of interesting engravings, made by himself. It can be compared with Doctrine for Naval Architecture by fellow-shipbuilder Anthony Dean, a mayor of Harwich and also a mentor of Peter the Great. It led to a correspondence between he and Peter the Great on modernising the Imperial Russian Navy, then backward by Western European standards.  This led to an order for warships from Amsterdam shipyards in return for an ukase (negotiated by Witsen) on Dutch-Russian trade, guaranteeing to supply the Republic with grain, wood, talc, tar and skins.  In 1697 Witsen organised a four-month training period for the tsar at the Dutch East India Company shipyards during his Grand Embassy, with the Tsar staying in Jacob J. Hinlopen's house and being taken by Witsen among many others to meet the botanist and anatomist Frederik Ruysch.

Cartography

After 20 years' study, Witsen published the first map of Siberia in 1690. This map represented the world from Nova Zembla to as far away as China. Witsen had discussed with the tsar the trade routes to Persia via the Caspian Sea and to China via Siberia. In 1692 he published a compendium titled "Noord en Oost Tartarye", describing Siberia and the surrounding areas, though without literary references. He consulted classical authors and Arabic medieval writers as well as his learned contemporaries in Europe. The second enlarged edition, a bulky book, also written in the 17th century Dutch, presents a rather complicated mixture of various texts with encyclopaedic details. It appeared in 1705 and was reprinted in 1785. In this book, Witsen gave an account of all the information available to the Europeans at that time about the northern and eastern parts of Europe and Asia, and also about the Volga area, Crimea, Caucasus, Central Asia, Mongolia, Tibet, China, Korea and the neighbouring parts of Japan. In the text, for instance, we find lists of 900 Georgian and 700 Kalmyk words and illustrations of the writing systems of Tibetan, Manchu and Mongolian languages. Witsen provides word lists and other data on more than 25 languages. In 1692 Witsen received the diary of Maarten Gerritsz Vries, who had explored the coast of Sahkalin in 1643, and it was never seen again.

Mayor and Maecenas
In 1688, Witsen was visited and invited more than once to discuss William III's proposed crossing to England, but he had great doubts and did not know what to advise. William Bentinck called him the most sensitive man in the world.  Of the other three burgomasters – Jean Appelman (a merchant trading with France), Johannes Hudde and Cornelis Geelvinck – Geelvinck openly opposed the enterprise and Appelman was not trusted by the prince and thus was not informed.  After the crossing went ahead, Witsen went to London in the next year to find a way of meeting the costs of 7,301,322 guilders the city of Amsterdam had incurred in supporting it.  William offered to knight him as a baronet, but the modest Witsen refused.

Already in his youth Witsen started to collect Siberian curiosities and artworks, gathering corals, lacquer, books, paintings, weapons, porcelain, insects, seashells, stuffed animals and precious stones into his house on Herengracht on the Golden Bend. As mayor, he was a patron of the arts and sciences and maintained contacts with German scholars, such as Leibniz.  He corresponded with Antonie van Leeuwenhoek, discovering tiny creatures under his microscope. In 1698 Willem de Vlamingh offered him two seashells from New Holland (Australia) and Witsen offered the drawings to Martin Lister. Witsen, who had invested in the journey, was disappointed that the men had been more interested in setting up trade than in exploring.

Witsen tried to introduce coffee plants from Batavia via Amsterdam to countries in South America. Boerhaave estimated that Witsen had put together a collection of more than 1500 paintings of plants that came to be known as the Codex Witsenii and were for the greater part of plants growing in and around the Cape Peninsula. These passed into the custody of Caspar Commelin, Professor of Botany at the Athenaeum Illustre and working in the Hortus Botanicus. After Commelin's death, they were passed to Johannes Burman, inspiring him to produce Rariorum africanarum plantarum in 1738-9. On Burman's death in 1779, his effects passed to his son, Nicolaas Laurens Burman. After his death in 1793, his effects, including the Codex, were sold by auction in 1800, disappearing from the records. Witsen had contact with the painter Jan de Bray over a plan to improve the city's water supply, and helped the artist Cornelis de Bruijn, who needed contacts in Egypt and Russia – indeed, it was probably Witsen who encouraged De Bruijn to make drawings of Persepolis, to show to the Royal Society.

46 people dedicated books to Witsen, including several by Olfert Dapper, one by the brother of Johan Nieuhof (including descriptions of Chinese shipbuilding), one by Jan van der Heyden on his invention of the fire hose and by the pharmacist Hermanus Angelkot jr. and Pieter Langendijk. He helped Maria Sybilla Merian to publish her prints with plants and insects from Surinam.

Witsen was also interested in religion but in an ecumenical way: his interests stretched to "saint Confucius" as he called him (based on his analysis of a Han dynasty Chinese mirror in his collection), as well as to shamanism. The minister famous for attacking witch-hunts, Balthasar Bekker, was his friend.

Witsen died in Amsterdam and was buried in Egmond aan den Hoef, not far from his country house, called "Tijdverdrijf" (=to pleasurably pass time). Peter the Great was present when Witsen died and said he lost a great friend. After Witsen's death, his notes were considered lost for a long time. His nephew Nicolaes Witsen (II) (1682-1746) inherited his library but was only moderately interested; 2,300 books were auctioned in 1728 and 1747; most in Latin, Dutch and French.
Nicolaes Witsen (III) the younger (1709-1780) inherited the manuscripts collected by several family members; sold at auction in 1761. In 1886 did it become known that copies of Nicolaas Witsen's diary and notes were kept in a Paris library; 300 years later his travelogue to Moscovy could be published.

Works
 N. Witsen, Moskovische Reyse 1664–1665. Journaal en Aentekeningen (Ed. Th.J.G. Locher and P. de Buck) ('s-Gravenhage, 1966; Transl.: Nikolaas Vitsen, Puteshestvie v Moskoviiu 1664–1665, St. Petersburg, 1996)
 N. Witsen, Aeloude en hedendaegsche scheepsbouw en bestier (1671)
 N. Witsen, Architectura navalis et regimen nauticum (second edition, 1690) 
 N. Witsen, Noord en Oost Tartarye, Ofte Bondig Ontwerp Van eenig dier Landen en Volken Welke voormaels bekent zijn geweest. Beneffens verscheide tot noch toe onbekende, en meest nooit voorheen beschreve Tartersche en Nabuurige Gewesten, Landstreeken, Steden, Rivieren, en Plaetzen, in de Noorder en Oosterlykste Gedeelten Van Asia En Europa Verdeelt in twee Stukken, Met der zelviger Land-kaerten: mitsgaders, onderscheide Afbeeldingen van Steden, Drachten, enz. Zedert naeuwkeurig onderzoek van veele Jaren, door eigen ondervondinge ontworpen, beschreven, geteekent, en in 't licht gegeven (Amsterdam MDCCV. First print: Amsterdam, 1692; Second edition: Amsterdam, 1705. Reprint in 1785)

See also: 
 Gerald Groenewald, 'To Leibniz, from Dorha: A Khoi prayer in the Republic of Letters', Itinerario 28-1 (2004) 29–48
 Willemijn van Noord & Thijs Weststeijn, 'The Global Trajectory of Nicolaas Witsen's Chinese Mirror', The Rijksmuseum Bulletin 63-4 (2015) 324–361
 Marion Peters, De wijze koopman. Het wereldwijde onderzoek van Nicolaes Witsen (1641–1717), burgemeester en VOC-bewindhebber van Amsterdam (Amsterdam 2010) [Transl.: "Mercator Sapiens. The Worldwide Investigations of Nicolaes Witsen, Amsterdam Mayor and Boardmember of the East India Company"] 
 Marion Peters, 'Nicolaes Witsen and Gijsbert Cuper. Two seventeenth-century Burgomasters and their Gordian Knot', Lias 16-1 (1989) 111–151
 Marion Peters, 'From the study of Nicolaes Witsen (1641–1717). His Life with Books and Manuscripts', Lias 21-1 (1994) 1–49
 Marion Peters, 'Nepotisme, patronage en boekdedicaties bij Nicolaes Witsen (1641–1717), burgemeester en VOC-bewindhebber van Amsterdam', Lias 25-1 (1998) 83–134

See also

 Hunmin Jeongeum
 Sakha language
 Anna Maria Sibylla Merian

References

External links

 Witsen's maps
 Biography
  Busken Huet – Het land van Rembrand
  The oldest Korean wordlist from Mr. Eibokken, written down by Witsen, translated into English.
 HIS LIFE WITH BOOKS AND MANUSCRIPTS

1641 births
1717 deaths
Nicolaes
Mayors of Amsterdam
Ambassadors of the Netherlands to England
Dutch shipbuilders
Dutch geographers
Fellows of the Royal Society
17th-century Dutch politicians
17th-century Dutch cartographers
17th-century diplomats
18th-century Dutch politicians
Writers from Amsterdam
Administrators of the Dutch East India Company